Asarum lemmonii is a species of wild ginger which is endemic to California. It is known by the common name Lemmon's wild ginger.

It is a spreading plant which forms dense green mats on the ground. The leaves are rich green and heart-shaped. It bears a small cup-shaped flower which is red externally and white inside. The plant grows in moist areas in the High Sierra.

References

External links
Jepson Manual Treatment
USDA Plants Profile

lemmonii
Flora of California